State leaders in the 4th century BC – State leaders in the 2nd century BC – State leaders by year
This is a list of state leaders in the 3rd century BC (300–201 BC).

Africa: North

Cyrene (complete list) –
Magas, King (276–250 BC)
Demetrius the Fair, King (250–249 BC)

Ptolemaic Kingdom of Egypt (complete list) –
Ptolemy I Soter, Pharaoh (305–283/282 BC)
Ptolemy II Philadelphus, Pharaoh (283–246 BC)
Ptolemy III Euergetes, Pharaoh (246–222 BC)
Ptolemy IV Philopator, Pharaoh (221–204 BC)
Ptolemy V Epiphanes, Pharaoh (204–181 BC)

Kush (complete list) –
Aktisanes, King (early 3rd century BC)
Aryamani, King (early 3rd century BC)
Kash(...), King (early 3rd century BC)
Piankhi-yerike-qa, King (early 3rd century BC)
Sabrakamani, King (early 3rd century BC)
Arakamani, King (270–260 BC)
Amanislo, King (260–250 BC)
Amantekha, King (mid 3rd century BC)
Sheshep-ankh-en-Amun Setepenre, King (mid–late 3rd century BC)
Arnekhamani, King (mid–late 3rd century BC)
Arqamani, King (3rd–2nd century BC)

Numidia (complete list) –
Eastern Numidia
Zelalsen, King (344–274 BC)
Gala, King (275–207 BC)
Ozalces, King (207–206 BC)
Capussa, King (206 BC)
Lacumazes, King (206 BC)
Masinissa, King (206–c.202 BC)
Western Numidia
Syphax, King (ante 215–202 BC)
Vermina, King (202 BC–?)
Archobarzane, King (?)
Numidia
Massinissa, King (202–148 BC)

Asia

Asia: East

China: Warring States period

Zhou, China: Eastern Zhou (complete list) –
Nan, King (314–256 BC)

Chu (complete list) –
Huai, King (328–299 BC)
Qingxiang, King (298–263 BC)
Kaolie, King (262–238 BC)
You, King (237–228 BC)
Ai, King (228 BC)
Fuchu, ruler (227–223 BC)
Changping, Lord (223 BC)

Han (complete list) –
Xiang, King (311–296 BC)
Xi, King (295–273 BC)
Huanhui, King (272–239 BC)
An, King (238–230 BC)

Qi: House of Tian (complete list) –
Xuan, King (319–300 BC)
Min, King (300–283 BC)
Xiang, King (283–265 BC)
Jian, ruler (264–221 BC)

Qin (complete list) –
Zhaoxiang, King (306–251 BC)
Xiaowen, King (250 BC)
Zhuangxiang, King (250–247 BC)
Qin Shi Huang, Emperor (246–210 BC)

Wei (complete list) –
Xiang, King (319–296 BC)
Zhao, King (296–277 BC)
Anxi, King (277–243 BC)
Jingmin, King (243–228 BC)
Jia, King (228–225 BC)

Yan (complete list) –
Xiao, King  (3rd century BC)
Xi, King (255–222 BC)

Zhao (complete list) –
Wuling, King (326–299 BC)
Huiwen, King (299–266 BC)
Xiaocheng, King (266–245 BC)
Daoxiang, King (245–236 BC)
Youmiu, King (236–228 BC)
Jia, King (228–222 BC)

China: Qin dynasty

Qin, China (complete list) –
Qin Shi Huang
King (246–221 BC)
Emperor (221–210 BC)
Qin Er Shi, Emperor (210–207 BC)
Ziying, King (207 BC)

China: Han dynasty

Western Han, China (complete list) –
Gaozu
King (206–202 BC)
Emperor (202–195 BC)

Asia: Southeast
Vietnam
Hồng Bàng dynasty (complete list) –
Hùng Duệ Vương, King (408–258 BC)

Âu Lạc (complete list) –
An Dương Vương, King (257–207 BC)

Triệu dynasty (complete list) –
Zhao Tuo, King (203–137 BC)

Asia: South

India

Maurya Empire (complete list) –
Chandragupta, Emperor (324–297 BC)
Bindusara, Emperor (297–273 BC)
Ashoka, Emperor (268–232 BC)
Dasharatha, Emperor (232–224 BC)
Samprati, Emperor (224–215 BC)
Shalishuka, Emperor (215–202 BC)
Devavarman, Emperor (202–195 BC)

Satavahana dynasty (Purana-based chronology) –
Simuka, King (228–205 BC)
Krishna, King (205–187 BC)

Sri Lanka

Anuradhapura Kingdom (complete list) –
Devanampiya Tissa, King (307–267 BC)
Uttiya, King (267–257 BC)
Mahasiva, King (257–247 BC)
Suratissa, King (247–237 BC)
Asela, King (215–205 BC)
Sena and Guttika, Kings (237–215 BC)
Ellalan, King (205–161 BC)

Asia: West

Kingdom of Bithynia (complete list) –
Zipoetes I
Dynast (326–297 BC)
King (297–278 BC)
Zipoetes II, King (278–276 BC)
Nicomedes I, King (278–255 BC)
Etazeta, Regent (255–254 BC)
Ziaelas, King (254–228 BC)
Prusias I Cholus, King (228–182 BC)

Bosporan Kingdom (complete list) –
Spartocids dynasty
Spartacus III, King (304–284 BC)
Pairisades II, King (284–c.245 BC)
Spartacus IV, King (c.245–c.240 BC)
Leucon II, King (c.240–c.220 BC)
Hygiainon, King (c.220–c.200 BC)
Spartacus V, King (c.200–c.180 BC)

Kingdom of Cappadocia (complete list) –
Ariarathes II, Suzerain King (301–280 BC)
Ariamnes II, King (280–230 BC)
Ariarathes III, King (255–220 BC)
Ariarathes IV, King (220–163 BC)

Colchis (complete list) –
Kuji, King (325–280 BC)

Greco-Bactrian Kingdom (complete list) –
Diodotus I, King (c.255–c.239 BC)
Diodotus II, King (c.252–c.223 BC)
Antiochus Nikator, possible king (c.230 BC)
Euthydemus I, King (c.230–c.200 BC)
Demetrius I, King (c. 200–c. 180 BC) – also Indo-Greek King

Indo-Greek Kingdom (complete list) –
Demetrius I, King (c.205–171 BC) – also Indo-Bactrian King

Parthian Empire (complete list) –
Arsaces I, King (250–246/211 BC)
Tiridates I, Great King, Shah (c.246–211 BC)
Arsaces II, King (211–191 BC)

Kingdom of Pergamon: Attalid dynasty (complete list) –
Philetaerus, King (282–263 BC)
Eumenes I, King (263–241 BC)
Attalus I Soter (241–197 BC)

Kingdom of Pontus (complete list) –
Mithridates I Ctistes, King (281–266 BC)
Ariobarzanes, King (266–250 BC)
Mithridates II, King (c.245–c.210 BC)
Mithridates III, King (c.210–c.190 BC)

Seleucid Empire (complete list) –
Seleucus I Nicator, King (305–281 BC)
Antiochus I Soter, King (291–261 BC)
Antiochus II Theos, King (261–246 BC)
Seleucus II Callinicus, King (246–225 BC)
Seleucus III Ceraunus, King (225–223 BC)
Antiochus III, the Great, King (223–187 BC)

Europe

Europe: Balkans

Achaean League (complete list) –
Margos of Keryneia 256 - 255 BC
Aratus of Sicyon I 245 - 244 BC
Aratus of Sicyon II 243 - 242 BC
Aegialeas 242 - 241 BC (?)
Aratus of Sicyon III 241 - 240 BC
Aratus of Sicyon IV 239 - 238 BC
Aratus of Sicyon V 237 - 236 BC
Dioedas 236 - 235 BC (or 244 - 243 BC)
Aratus of Sicyon VI 235 - 234 BC
Lydiadas of Megalopolis I 234 - 233 BC
Aratus of Sicyon VII 233 - 232 BC
Lydiadas of Megalopolis II 232 - 231 BC
Aratus of Sicyon VIII 231 - 230 BC
Lydiadas of Megalopolis III 230 - 229 BC 
Aratus of Sicyon IX 229 - 228 BC
Aristomachos of Argos 228 - 227 BC
Aratus of Sicyon X 227 - 226 BC 
Hyperbatas 226 - 225 BC
Timoxenos 225 - 224 BC (Aratus of Sicyon held the exceptional office of strategos autokrator)
Aratus of Sicyon XI 224 - 223 BC
Timoxenos 223 - 222 BC (?)
Aratus of Sicyon XII 222 - 221 BC
Timoxenos 221 - 220 BC
Aratus of Sicyon XIII 220 - 219 BC
Aratus the Younger of Sicyon 219 - 218 BC 
Epiratos of Pharae 218 - 217 BC
Aratus of Sicyon XIV 217 - 216 BC 
Timoxenos 216 - 215 BC
Aratus of Sicyon XV 215 - 214 BC
Aratus of Sicyon XVI 213 BC 
Euryleon of Aegium 211 - 210 BC 
Kykliadas of Pharae 210 - 209 BC 
Philopoemen of Megalopolis I 209 - 208 BC
Nikias 208 - 207 BC 
Philopoemen of Megalopolis II 207 - 206 BC
Lysippos 202 - 201 BC (?)
Philopoemen of Megalopolis III 201 - 200 BC
Kykliadas of Pharae 200 - 199 BC

Epirus (complete list) –
Pyrrhus I, King (307–302 BC, 297–272 BC)
Neoptolemos II, King (302–297 ВС)
Alexander II, King (272–255 ВС)
Olympias II of Epirus, Regent (255 BC–?)
Pyrrhus II, King (255–237 BC)
Ptolemy, King (237–234 BC) 
Pyrrhus III, King (235–c.233 BC)
Deidamia, King (233 BC)

Macedonia: Antigonid dynasty (complete list) –
Demetrius I Poliorcetes, King (294–288 BC)
Antigonus II Gonatas, King (277–274, 272–239 BC)
Demetrius II Aetolicus, King (239–229 BC)
Antigonus III Doson, King (229–221 BC)
Philip V, King (221–179 BC)

Odrysian kingdom of Thrace (complete list) –
Seuthes III, King (331–300 BC)
Cotys II, King (300–280 BC)
Raizdos, King (280 BC–?)
Cotys III, King (270 BC)
Rhescuporis I, King (240–215 BC)
Seuthes IV, King (215–190 BC)

Paeonia (complete list) –
Audoleon, King (315–285 BC)
Ariston, King (286–285 BC)
Leon, King (278–250 BC)
Dropion, King (250–230 BC)

Europe: East

Dacia (complete list) –
Dual, King (3rd century BC)
Rhemaxos, King (c.200 BC)
Moskon, King (3rd century BC)
Dromichaetes, King (3rd century BC)
Zalmodegicus, King (late 3rd century BC)

Europe: South

Roman Republic (complete list) –

Syracuse (complete list) –
Agathocles, Tyrant (317–289 BC)
Hicetas, Tyrant (289–280 BC)
 & , Tyrants (279–277 BC)
Pyrrhus of Epirus, Tyrant (278–276 BC)
Hiero II, Tyrant (275–215 BC)
Hieronymus, Tyrant (215–214 BC)

Eurasia: Caucasus

Kingdom of Armenia (complete list) –
Orontes III, King (321–260 BC) 
Sames, King (c.260 BC)
Arsames I, King (260–c.228 BC)
Orontes IV, King (c.212–200 BC)

Kingdom of Iberia (Kartli) (complete list) –
Pharnavaz I, King (299–234 BC)
Sauromaces I, King (234–159 BC)

References

State Leaders
-
3rd-century BC rulers